Magie Faure-Vidot (sometimes Mrs. Maggie Vijay-Kumar or Magic Mags) is a French-language poet from the Seychelles who has also published work in English and Seychellois Creole.

Life and career

Magie Faure-Vidot was born in Victoria.She is one of the regional directors of Motivational Strips, the world's most active writers forum. This forum has active writers from 167 countries. Ms Magie Faure Vidot is currently the chief editor for literary journal SIPAY. This literary journal is the national property of Department Of Culture, Government of Seychelles. She is also a member of the Institut Académique de Paris and the Académie Internationale de Lutèce.  She has won numerous prizes over the course of her career, including the Coupe de la Ville de Paris, a Lyre d'honneur, and six silver and numerous bronze medals in various international literary competitions, and she has represented her home country at many international poetry festivals and other initiatives. Her work has been discussed in critical studies of Seychellois literature. She has also achieved some fame as an oral performer.

After living for some time in the United States, Lebanon, England, Italy, and France, Faure-Vidot returned to the Seychelles. There she cofounded, and continues to codirect, both the online literary review Vents Alizés and the online publishing house Edisyon Losean Endyen, both of which she runs in conjunction with Hungarian poet Károly Sándor Pallai. Her work is regularly published in Seychelles Nation and The People, and she is the Chief Editor/Director of Publication of Sipay, the only Seychellois International literary magazine. She is also heavily engaged in the cultural life of her country, including showing her work at exhibitions of art by local women. Her poems were published in the international poetry anthology Amaravati Poetic Prism in India. In 2017, 2018 and 2019. she received the prestigious Seychelles Arts Award in literature from 2017-2019 for her outstanding literary work and achievements. She writes for Spirit of Nature where she features amongst the 60 poets to be published in 2019.Opa Anthology of Poetry 2019.

She is a member of the World Nations Writers Union (WNWU) Kazakhstan.  She is the Regional Director - East Africa and Asia and a Director Board  Member of the Motivational Strips, World's Most Active Writers' Forum. On 21 December 2019 she was conferred with the PEACOCK o PINION, SUPERIOR EXCELLENCE,  from Motivational Strips, it being a distinguished honour for providing qualitative assistance to World Literature.  She is a member of the UHE to note the President in the Seychelles for the UHE as well as Continental Coordinator for UHE in Africa

Her work was featured in the "Family Eternal Treasure" international anthology (2018).  She has attended to various international literary conferences such in Luxembourg, Mauritius, La Reunion, Poetic Prism in Vijayawada, Andrapradesh, Isisar Kolkata, France and has been translated into some foreign languages and included into various international literary journals.  Talks given to the University of Seychelles, Primary and Secondary schools in the Seychelles, University, Colleges, primary and secondary schools in La Reunion, at the Creole Institute of the Seychelles.  Interviewed by BBC.com.uk on 20 May 2020, by several other countries also such as Australia, France,  Romania, Italy, India, Seychelles, Mauritius, Luxembourg, Tunisia

Works

 From May 2009 till December 2022 has edited/
  published 28 SIPAY GLOBAL LITERARY JOURNAL.  
  French, English, Creole and Spanish.
   
 :Whispers of Souls/Murmures des Ames by LES 
 EDITIONS DU NET - France February 2020
  and the undermentioned my personal ones
 The Enchanting Rebirth/ Une Renaissance Magique, Arthee Editions 2019
 L'Oasis des mots, Victoria, Edisyon Losean Endyen, 2016.
 Rêves créoles, Victoria, Edisyon Losean Endyen, 2012.
 Flamme mystique, Victoria, Yaw Enterprises, 2011.
 L'âme errante, Victoria, Printec Press Holdings, 2003.
 Un grand cœur triste, Paris, La Pensée Universelle, 1983.

Honors, awards, certifications, training, and membership
Prestigious international award 2022, International Litera and Artistic, the Heinrich Boll Prize /Germany.

- World Thinkers And Writers'Peace Meet (ISISAR) - 08-12/11/2022 - Kolkata, India.

- Peace Award Dr. Juan Carlos Martinez PERU 21/09/22    

 Top 10 international recipients of the medal Independence of India 2022 July, Gujarat Sahitya Academy and MS

 Certificate de Appreciation SIR RICHARD FRANCIS BURTON from UHE, Peru, 2022

 Golden Eagle from UHE July 2022.

•Heinrich Boll International

Literary & Artistic Prize 2021 in Germany.
 Award of the Renewal of Presidente Nacional de Escritotes UHE:  EN  Seychelles 
2020-2022 
SILVER ESCUDOS DE PLATA 2021 - UHE
  
   Independence Day
   Honour, 2nd time
   from MS jointly
   with Gujarat Sahitya
   Academy for 2021 and 2022,

 WORLD POETIC PILLARS AWARD 2020/2021 from
  World Nation Writers' Union WNWU -June 2021
 GOLDEN EAGLE- humanistic Excellence from UHE  
  - June 2021 
 Amongst the top poets from 104 countries in
  the top ranked No. 1 in Amazon in June 2021, 
   Best Seller, POETS UNIFY WORLD. 
 Awarded the Intellectual Humanity Order
  of Excellence by WCHHD 5/04/21
 Appointed Continental Coordinator of 
  the Hispanic World Writers Union (UHE)      
   in Africa.
  Appointed in 2020 UHE President in the 
   Seychelles.
 CESAR VILLEJO Award from UHE December 2020
 MEDAL of Kairat Duissenov Parman 28/12/2020
World Award PARAGON OF HOPE from RADIO/TV Canada and HERA FOUNDATION of NEW YORK JULY 2020.
Honoured by Motivational Strips and Gujarat Sahitya Academy in August 2020
Appointed on the WCHHD Academic Board of Directors on 6 August 2020.
Appointed National President of the Hispanomundial Writers (UHE) in Seychelles in September 2020.
 Appointed Chief Representative of WNWU for South East Africa and  Asia
 Recipient of world rare and precious prize, "FOR MERITS TO THE DEVELOPMENT OF WORLD LITERATURE" - For the 1150th 
  anniversary AL- FARABI
 Appointed Her Excellency Magie F-V Vijay-Kumar as Ambassador  for Humanity and humanitarian development for the    
  Waheed Centre for Humanity and Humanitarian Development by Prince Waheed of WCHHD of Ghana 27/04/2020
Interviewed by the BBC.com News on 14/04/2020
 Laureate of World Award of Literary Excellence from the Government of Peru in joint association with Union Hispanomundial De Escritores, Motivational Strips and World Nations' Writers' Union WNWU in February 2020.
 Awarded Diploma 1st Level - Distinction - Temirqazyq Contest World Nations Writers' Union Feb 2020.
 Appointed Chief Consultant for the Association des Ecrivains Rodriguais, Rep. of Mauritius by MS on 30/01/2020
 Appointed Representative of ISISAR in African Union - India on 27 December 2019.
 Awarded the PEACOCK o PINION, SUPERIOR EXCELLENCE, from the World's Most active Forum by the Founder Shiju H. 
  Pallithazheth and Forum Director Sabrina Young of Motivational Strips.
 Certificate of Participation at the Amaravati Poetic Prism 2019- 5th International Multilingual Poets' Meet in 
  Vijayawada, Andhra Pradesh - India on 21-22/12/2019.
 Certificate and Plaque in the occasion of the World Thinkers' and Writers' Peace Meet 27-31/12/2019 ISISAR KOLKATA.
Plaque from Parvathananeni Brahmayya Siddhartha Collegeof Arts and Science on the International Conference on Contemporary World Literatures 19-20/12/2019.
 Features in the Global Poetry Web as Poet of the day 27/11/2019.
 Appointed Chief Consultant of Literary Review of World Literary CONGO ECRIT - Academy of Sciences and Engineering for Africa Development (ASEAD) Oct. 2019.
 Obtained Certificate of Participation on Training on Copyright in Seychelles - NAC/Trade Division Ministry of Finance, Trade, Investment and Economic Planning - 9/10/2019
  Order of Shakespeare Medal from Motivational Strips in October 2019.
 Diploma -World Poetic Star - Excellence in the field of World Literature from World Nations Writers' Union - WNWU Khzakhstan
 Member of the Validation Reading Committee for CONGO ECRIT review on 03/08/2019
 Appointed Ambassador At Large for WORLD INSTITUTE OF PEACE of Nigeria, in the Seychelles on 21/07/2019
 Appointed Chief Consultant to Writers/Artists Association LAR SAN FRONTYER in the SEYCHELLES on 01/07/2019
 Facilitator for the World Poetry Day Workshop, National Arts Council - Certificate of Participation - 22/03/2019
 World Laureate in Literature 2018 - WNWU (World Nations Writers' Union) Kazakhstan
 Certificate in International Award - World Icon of Peace - WIP - Feb 2019
 'Global Literature Guardian Award' by Motivational Strips, World's most active writers forum - 31/12/2018
 "Hon. Author's Certificate" by Motivational Strips - 10/09/2018
 Program Council Member - Ambassador De Literature -   MS, Sept 2018
 Dean of Motivational Strips Academy of Literary Excellence and Wisdom   MSALEW, Poetry Research MS - 10/09/2018
 Chief Admin for SE African countries for Motivational Strips   MS - (08/2018)
  Member of the World Nations Writers' Union - Kazakhstan - (08/06/2018)
  Appointed member of DO KRE I.S Revue haitienne de cultures creoles - Comite de Redaction
  Appointed Ambassador of Humanity by his Royal Highness Uman Baba Musah and Prince Waheed Musah of Ghana
  Launched 6th Poetry Anthology on 22/03/2019, The Enchanting Rebirth/Renaissance Magique

References

External links
Author's webpage

1958 births
Living people
Seychellois poets
Seychellois women writers
Seychellois women poets
20th-century poets
20th-century women writers
21st-century poets
21st-century women writers
Seychellois writers in French
People from Greater Victoria, Seychelles
Writers in Seychellois Creole
English-language writers